Bones of the Moon is a novel by American writer Jonathan Carroll, depicting the real and dream life of a young woman. Like many of Carroll's works, it straddles the horror and fantasy genres.

The novel follows a young woman named Cullen James. While a contented housewife by day, in dreams she is one of several questers after the Bones of the Moon, which grant power over the dream world of Rondua. Gradually, dream events begin to bleed over into the real world in frightening ways.

Plot summary
In New York City, Cullen James' greatest wishes are being fulfilled: She marries her best friend; she travels in Europe; she has a baby daughter.

But by night, bizarre dreams begin to intrude. In her dreams, Cullen visits a strange land called Rondua, where the sea is full of fish with mysterious names. She and a huge dog named Mr. Tracy escort a young boy named Pepsi across places such as the Northern Stroke, the Mountains of Coin and Brick, and the Plain of Forgotten Machines. Together they search for the Bones of the Moon, five bones that grant power over Rondua.

As Cullen's days become more disjointed and episodic, her dreams grow in intensity. While searching for the last of the bones, she learns more about the adversary she and her dream friends race against. Bit by bit, the events in Rondua start affecting her life on earth, intersecting in unpleasant, then frightening ways.

Characters
Real world
Cullen James, a young woman who seeks the Bones of the Moon in her dreams
Danny James, Cullen's husband
Mae, their baby daughter
Eliot, her upstairs neighbor
Alvin Williams, the Axe Boy, a polite young man who kills his mother and sister
Weber Gregston, a movie director
Rondua
Pepsi, a young boy seeking after the bones
Mr. Tracy, a dog the size of a hot-air balloon who wears a bowler hat
Jack Chili, the ruler of Rondua

Major themes

The novel deals heavily with the emotional consequences of abortion.

Allusions and references from other works
Weber Gregston, a minor character in this novel, is the main character in A Child Across the Sky.
The "A Game of You" story arc of Neil Gaiman's Sandman comic book is similar to this novel, as acknowledged in the preface to the graphic novel of the same name. The two stories were written separately, with neither author having knowledge of the other's work. When Gaiman read Bones of the Moon, he considered scrapping the storyline, but Carroll told him to go ahead. This is why there is a copy of Bones of the Moon visible in the lead character's bookcase in the comics.

Reception
In their January 1987 issue, Kirkus Reviews wrote, "Carroll's greatest successes here are with lovable characters, not with his plot—and then only with the characters from real life, not those from psychedelic Rondua—which lacks a sufficiently felt imagination, some kind of tactile sting, so that it's hard to care about human problems amid its burgeoning symbols."

Dave Langford reviewed Bones of the Moon for White Dwarf #94, writing, "As in Carroll's fine novel The Land of Laughs, the apparent whimsies are heavily booby-trapped and the sudden conclusion leaves you shaken. Highly recommended."

Reviews
Review by Mark Valentine (1987) in Vector 140
Review by Faren Miller (1987) in Locus, #322 November 1987
Review by Darrell Schweitzer (1988) in Aboriginal Science Fiction, March-April 1988
Review by Don D'Ammassa (1988) in Science Fiction Chronicle, #102 March 1988
Review by Kathryn Cramer (1988) in The New York Review of Science Fiction, November 1988
Review by Andy Robertson (1988) in Interzone, #23 Spring 1988
Review by John Clute (1989) in Interzone, #32 November-December 1989
Review by Gregory Feeley (1989) in Foundation, #44 Winter 1988/89
Review by Janeen Webb (1991) in The New York Review of Science Fiction, June 1991
Review by Bruce Gillespie (1992) in SF Commentary, #71/72
Review by Don D'Ammassa (2002) in Science Fiction Chronicle, #223 April 2002
Review by Chris Hill (2002) in Vector 225

References

1987 American novels
1987 fantasy novels
American fantasy novels
American horror novels
Contemporary fantasy novels
Novels about abortion
Novels by Jonathan Carroll
Arbor House books